Grimminghausen is a locality in the municipality Schmallenberg in the district Hochsauerlandkreis in North Rhine-Westphalia, Germany.

Geography 
The village has 52 inhabitants and lies in the west of the municipality of Schmallenberg at a height of around 329 m on the Kreisstraße 38. The river Wenne flows through the village. Grimminghausen borders on the villages of Menkhausen, Lochtrop, Dorlar and Hengsbeck.

History 
The first written document mentioning "Grimmardichusen" dates from 1282. The first chapel in the village was built around 1600. In 1900 was the new St. Peter and Paul Chapel built. The village used to belong to the municipality of Dorlar until the end of 1974.

Gallery

References

Villages in North Rhine-Westphalia
Schmallenberg